The Filkars River (in French: rivière Filkars) is a tributary of the Beaurivage River which is a tributary of the west bank of the Chaudière River (slope of the south bank of the St. Lawrence River). It flows in the municipalities of Saint-Sylvestre, Sainte-Agathe-de-Lotbinière and Saint-Patrice-de-Beaurivage, in the Lotbinière Regional County Municipality, in the administrative region of Chaudière-Appalaches, in Québec, in Canada.

Geography 
The main neighboring watersheds of the Filkars river are:
 north side: rivière du Chêne, Henri River, Beaurivage River;
 east side: Saint-André River, Fourchette River, Beaurivage River, Nadeau River, Lessard River, Chaudière River;
 south side: Bécancour River, Palmer River, Palmer East River;
 west side: Armagh River, Bécancour River.

This head area is located near the locality "Le Radar", that is to say to the northeast of the summit of Mont Handkerchief and to the southwest of the summit of Mont Sainte-Marguerite, to the north of the Palmer River and northeast of the village of Saint-Pierre-de-Broughton.

From its source, the Filkars River flows over  divided into the following segments:

Upper course of the river (segment of )

From the small head lake dam, the Filkars river flows over:
  north-west, to a country road;
  north-west, up to the road;
  north-west, to the limit of the municipality of Sainte-Agathe-de-Lotbinière;
  north to the confluence of the Armagh River (coming from the west);

Lower course of the river (segment of )

From the confluence of the Armagh River, the Filkars River flows over:
  east, to a country road;
  northeasterly, crossing route 269, to its confluence.

Toponymy 
Filkars would be derived from Felker's (owned by Felker) after the name of a landowner from New Hampshire. David Felker lived in Saint-Sylvestre between 1824 and 1839.

See also 

 List of rivers of Quebec

References 

Rivers of Chaudière-Appalaches
Lotbinière Regional County Municipality